The Pomeranian or Pommern duck (in German Pommernente) is a breed of domesticated duck. It is a landrace originating in the German part of the baltic sea coast region called Pomerania. Pomeranian ducks share the same ancestors with other northern European duck breeds, such as the Shetland duck and Swedish Blue duck.

Description
The Pomeranian duck is a medium-sized bird, male weighs 3 kg; the female usually weighs 2.5 kg. The body is traditionally black or blue with a white breast. They have dark (preferably black) beaks and feet and dark brown eyes. They produce 70-100 eggs per year of 80-90 grams weight.

See also
 List of duck breeds

References

Duck breeds
Duck breeds originating in Germany
Conservation Priority Breeds of the Livestock Conservancy
Duck breeds originating in Prussia
Pomerania
Animal breeds on the GEH Red List